The men's volleyball tournament at the 2002 Asian Games was held from Tuesday October 2 to Saturday October 13, 2002 in Busan, South Korea. The men's volleyball event was contested for the 12th time at the Asian Games.

China and Japan's best players had to miss the event due to the schedule conflicting with the 2002 FIVB Volleyball Men's World Championship in Argentina, but South Korea withdrew from the world championship to participate in Asian Games.

Squads

Results
All times are Korea Standard Time (UTC+09:00)

Preliminary round

Pool A

|}

Pool B

|}

Rank round

Semifinals

|}

7th–8th place

|}

5th–6th place

|}

Final round

Semifinals

|}

3rd–4th place

|}

Final

|}

Final standing

References

 Results

External links
Official website

Men